Kamenica is a small settlement in the Municipality of Metlika in the White Carniola area of southeastern Slovenia, right on the border with Croatia. The entire area is part of the traditional region of Lower Carniola and is now included in the Southeast Slovenia Statistical Region.

References

External links
Kamenica on Geopedia

Populated places in the Municipality of Metlika